Eriprando Madruzzo (died 1547) was an Italian mercenary captain.  The brother of the Bishop of Trent Cristoforo Madruzzo, he fought in Hungary against the Turks at the service of Charles V. 

During the Italian Wars, he commanded the Imperial landsknechts at the Battle of Ceresole in 1544, being wounded in the fray. The following year he was entrusted the security of the Council of Trent.

In 1546 Madruzzo took part to the wars against the Protestants in Germany, and died at Ulm in 1547.

Notes

References 
Madruzzo genealogy 

1547 deaths
Eriprando
16th-century condottieri
Military leaders of the Italian Wars
Year of birth unknown